This is the list of academicians (full members) of the National Academy of Sciences of Ukraine. Bolded names indicate academicians who serve or served as presidents of the academy. Bolded years (years of death) indicate that academicians were elected at their year of death or later.

1910
 14 November 1918 Dmytro Bahaliy (1857–1932) history of Ukraine
 14 November 1918 Volodymyr Vernadskyi (1863–1945) physics and mathematical sciences
 17 May 1919 Kostiantyn Voblyi (1876–1947) economics, economic geography
 31 May 1919 Mykola Biliashivskyi (1867–1926) archaeology
 15 June 1919 Alexander Eichenwald (1864–1944) physics

1920
 1 January 1920 Nicolai Andrusov (1861–1924) geology
 8 March 1920 Dmitry Grave (1863–1939) mathematics
 ? 1920 Mykola Vasylenko (1866–1935) history
 5 December 1921 Yevhen Votchal (1864–1937) botany, physiology
 25 June 1923 Oleksiy Huliayev (1863–1923) civil law
 7 April 1924 Volodymyr Hnatiuk (1871–1926) Ukrainian folk Slavistics
 1 May 1924 Oleksiy Giliarov (1855–1938) philosophy
 1 May 1924 Mykhailo Hrushevskyi (1866–1934) history of Ukraine
 9 February 1925 Sergei Bernstein (1880–1968) mathematics
 9 March 1925 Volodymyr Hordon (1871–1926) civil law
 6 April 1925 Ivan Horbachevsky (1854–1942) biochemistry
 ? 1925 Ivan Borodin (1847–1930) botany // Russia
 ? 1925 Vladyslav Buzeskul (1858–1931) history
 22 November 1926 Vladimir Grabar (1865–1956) international law
 ? 1928 Mykola Volkovych (1858–1928) pathophysiology
 29 June 1929 Aleksandr Bogomolets (1881–1946) pathophysiology
 29 June 1929 Nikolai Vavilov (1887–1943) botany // Russia
 29 June 1929 Mykhailo Vozniak (1881–1954) literary studies
 29 June 1929 Oleksandr Goldman (1884–1971) experimental physics

1930
 ? 1930 Konstantin Gedroits (1872–1932) agrarian chemistry // Russia
 27 May 1934 Izrail Agol (1891–1937) genetics
 27 May 1934 Volodymyr Vorobyov (1876–1937) anatomy
 22 February 1939 Oleksandr Biletsky (1884–1961) literary studies
 22 February 1939 Oleksandr Brodskyi (1895–1969) physical chemistry
 22 February 1939 Petr Budnikov (1885–1968) chemistry, silicate technology // Russia
 22 February 1939 Leonid Bulakhovskyi (1888–1961) linguistics
 22 February 1939 Eugen Varga (1879–1964) economics // Russia
 22 February 1939 Heorhiy Vysotskyi (1865–1940) forest and soil studies, geobotany
 22 February 1939 Mykola Hryshko (1901–1964) genetics, plant breeding

1940
 12 February 1945 Mykola Hudziy (1887–1965) literary studies
 30 June 1948 Evgeni Babsky (1902–1973) physiology // Russia
 30 June 1948 Nikolai Barabashov (1894–1971) astronomy
 30 June 1948 Fedir Beliankin (1892–1972) structural engineering
 30 June 1948 Nikolay Bogolyubov (1909–1992) mathematical physics
 30 June 1948 Andriy Vasylenko (1891–1963) machine manufacture, agricultural mechanics
 30 June 1948 Petro Vlasiuk (1895–1980) physiology of plant nutrition, agrarian soil science
 30 June 1948 Oleg Vialov (1904–1988) geology
 30 June 1948 Boris Gnedenko (1912–1995) mathematics // Russia
 30 June 1948 Leonid Hreben (1888–1980) animal science
 30 June 1948 Max Gubergriz (1886–1951) therapy

1950
 19 May 1951 Mykola Bazhan (1904–1983) literary studies
 19 May 1951 Volodymyr Bondarchuk (1905–1993) geology
 19 May 1951 Ivan Bulankin (1901–1960) biochemistry
 19 May 1951 Anton Valter (1905–1965) physics
 23 January 1957 Anatoly Babko (1905–1968) analytical chemistry
 23 January 1957 Vladimir Belitser (1906–1988) biochemistry
 23 January 1957 Ivan Bilodid (1906–1981) Ukrainian language
 23 January 1957 Danila Vorontsov (1886–1965) normal physiology
 23 January 1957 Maksym Hulyi (1905–2007) animal biochemistry

1960
 18 April 1961 Victor Glushkov (1923–1982) computational mathematics and systems
 18 April 1961 Viktor Hutyria (1910–1983) crude oil chemistry
 10 June 1964 Aleksandr Akhiezer (1911–2000) theoretical physics
 10 June 1964 Vadym Vasylyev (1912–2003) entomology
 17 December 1965 Volodymyr Arkharov (1907–1997) solid-state physics
 17 December 1965 Oleksandr Halkin (1914–1982) experimental physics
 20 December 1967 Oleg Antonov (1906–1984) aircraft manufacture
 20 December 1967 Vasyl Budnyk (1913–2007) mechanics, machine manufacture
 20 December 1967 Vitaliy Gridnev (1908–1990) metallurgy, metal studies
 26 December 1969 Nikolai Amosov (1913–2002) medical surgery
 26 December 1969 Semion Braude (1911–2003) radio astronomy
 26 December 1969 Volodymyr Marchenko (1922– ) mathematical physics

1970
 17 March 1972 Vasyl Atroshchenko (1906–1991) chemical engineering
 17 March 1972 Borys Babiy (1914–1993) history of state and law
 17 March 1972 Borys Vierkin (1919–1990) physics and low temperature engineering
 27 December 1973 Oleksandr Alymov (1923– ) industrial economics
 27 December 1973 Fedir Babychev (1917–2000) organic chemistry, heterocyclic compound
 27 December 1973 Petro Bahriy (1925–1981) economics
 2 April 1976 Oleksiy Bohatskyi (1929–1983) organic chemistry
 2 April 1976 Sergey Gershenzon (1906–1998) molecular biology, genetics
 23 March 1978 Oleksandr Huz (1939– ) mechanics
 29 March 1978 Viktor Baryakhtar (1930–2020) solid-state physics
 29 March 1978 Petro Bohach (1918–1981) physiology, medicine
 29 March 1978 Oles Honchar (1918–1995) literary studies
 29 March 1978 Oleksandr Horodyskyi (1930–1992) electrochemistry
 29 March 1978 Volodymyr Panasiuk (1926– ) materials science, strength of materials
 26 December 1979 Anatoliy Berezhnoy (1910–1996) chemistry
 26 December 1979 Mykola Bondar (1920–1994) structural mechanics
 26 December 1979 Feodosiy Hrynevych (1922–2015) electronic tests
 26 December 1979 Andriy Hrodzynskyi (1926–1988) plant physiology

1980
 1 April 1982 Mykhailo Brodyn (1931– ) solid-state physics, spectroscopy, optoelectronics
 1 April 1982 Valeriy Lishko (1937– ) molecular biology, genetics
 15 January 1988 Serhiy Andronati (1940– ) bioorganic chemistry
 15 January 1988 Valeriy Beliayev (1931–1999) geophysics
 15 January 1988 Yuriy Berezansky (1925–2019) differential equation
 15 January 1988 Dmitriy Volkov (1925–1996) theoretical physics
 15 January 1988 Yuriy Hleba (1949– ) cellular plant engineering
 15 January 1988 Valentyn Hryshchenko (1928–2011) cryobiology, cryomedicine
 15 January 1988 Anatoliy Dolinskyi (1931–2022) thermal engineering
 15 January 1988 Yuriy Yermolyev (1936– ) mathematical cybernetics

1990
 18 May 1990 Oleksandr Bakayev (1927–2009) economics of Agro-Industrial Complex
 18 May 1990 Zoya Butenko (1928–2001) experimental oncology
 18 May 1990 Mykhailo Hasyk (1929–2021) metallurgy of steel and ferro alloys
 18 May 1990 Mykhailo Holubets (1930–2016) geobotany
 18 May 1990 Dmytro Hrodzynskyi (1929–2016) radiobiology
 18 May 1990 Volodymyr Morhun (1938– ) genetics and breeding
 18 May 1990 Leonid Pastur (1937– ) mathematics
 11 April 1991 Oleksandr Vozianov (1938–2018) medical surgery, urology
 11 April 1991 Serhiy Komisarenko (1943– ) immunology
 25 November 1992 Lukyan Anatychuk (1937– ) materials science
 25 November 1992 Mykola Bulhakov (1929–2004) hydrogeology
 25 November 1992 Anatoliy Vizir (1929–2002) clinical medicine
 25 November 1992 Sergey Volkov (1935–2016) chemistry
 25 November 1992 Yevhen Honcharuk (1930–2004) hygiene
 25 November 1992 Ivan Horban (1928–2000) solid-state physics
 25 November 1992 Yaroslav Hryhorenko (1927–2022) mechanics
 25 November 1992 Hanna Yelska (1940– ) molecular biology
 25 November 1992 Mykola Zhulynskyi (1940– ) Ukrainian literature
 25 November 1992 Vsevolod Kuntsevych (1929– ) control systems
 25 November 1992 Leonid Lytvynenko (1938– ) astronomy, radioastronomy
 14 April 1995 Hryhoriy Verves (1920–2001) Slavic linguistics, foreign Slavic literature
 14 April 1995 Ivan Vyshnevskyi (1938–2017) nuclear engineering
 14 April 1995 Valeriy Hayets (1945– ) macroeconomy
 14 April 1995 Viktor Hrinchenko (1937– ) mechanics
 14 April 1995 Mykhailo Zghurovskyi (1950– ) computer science, computational systems
 4 December 1997 Vladyslav Honcharuk (1941– ) chemistry
 4 December 1997 Volodymyr Horbulin (1939– ) information technology, strategic security
 4 December 1997 Oleh Kryshtal (1945– ) human and animal physiology
 4 December 1997 Leonid Lobanov (1940– ) materials science
 4 December 1997 Dmytro Melnychuk (1943– ) biochemistry
 4 December 1997 Anton Naumovets (1936– ) surface physics
 4 December 1997 Oleksiy Onyshchenko (1933– ) culturology
 20 December 1997 Yakov Belevtsev (1912–1993) geology of ore deposits
 ? 1997 Hennadiy Pivniak (1940– ) mining and metallurgical electric power industry

2000
 7 April 2000 Anatoliy Bulat (1947– ) mining engineering
 7 April 2000 Vasyl Kremen (1947– ) philosophy
 7 April 2000 Mykhailo Kulyk (1940– ) general power engineering
 7 April 2000 Ivan Lukovskyi (1935– ) mathematics
 7 June 2000 Serhiy Pyrozhkov (1948– ) demography
 16 April 2003 Volodymyr Lytvyn (1956– ) modern history of Ukraine
 16 May 2003 Oleksandr Amosha (1937– ) economics
 16 May 2003 Borys Burkinskyi (1942– ) regional economics
 16 May 2003 Leonid Huberskyi (1941– ) philosophy
 16 May 2003 Orest Ivasyshyn (1946– ) experimental physics, physics of metals
 16 May 2003 Oleksandr Konovalenko (1951– ) radioastronomy
 16 May 2003 Veniamin Kubenko (1938– ) mechanics
 16 May 2003 Vadym Loktiev (1945– ) theoretical physics, physics of superconductivity
 16 May 2003 Yuriy Matsevytyi (1934– ) thermal physics
 16 May 2003 Anatoliy Popov (1937– ) physical and organic chemistry
 30 April 2004 Ivan Nekliudov (1935– ) radioactive materials science
 6 May 2006 Pylyp Andon (1938– ) computer science
 6 May 2006 Volodymyr Azhazha (1931–2009) nuclear engineering
 6 May 2006 Yaroslav Blium (1956– ) zoology
 6 May 2006 Borys Bondarenko (1938–2020) thermal engineering
 6 May 2006 Leonid Bulavin (1945– ) experimental nuclear physics
 6 May 2006 Valeriy Vorona (1940– ) sociology
 6 May 2006 Petro Hozhyk (1937–2020) paleontology, stratigraphy
 6 May 2006 Borys Grynyov (1956– ) materials science
 6 May 2006 Anatoliy Zahorodniy (1951– ) theoretical physics
 6 May 2006 Oleksandr Kyrylenko (1950– ) power engineering
 6 May 2006 Viacheslav Koshechko (1946– ) physical chemistry
 6 May 2006 Valentyn Matveyev (1929– ) mechanics
 6 May 2006 Zinoviy Nazarchuk (1952– ) materials science, diagnostics of materials
 6 May 2006 Oleksandr Palahin (1939– ) computer science
 6 May 2006 Valentyn Pidhorskyi (1937– ) microbiology
 4 February 2009 Oleksandr Bakay (1938– ) nuclear engineering
 4 February 2009 Anatoliy Bilous (1951– ) inorganic chemistry
 4 February 2009 Vadym Bolshakov (1938–2015) metallurgy
 4 February 2009 Mykola Veselovskyi (1950– ) cell biology
 4 February 2009 Ihor Voitovych (1932–2014) systems and technologies of information registration
 4 February 2009 Anatoliy Goltsev (1943– ) cryobiology
 4 February 2009 Heorhiy Hryhorenko (1939–2019) materials science, electrometallurgy
 4 February 2009 Bohdan Danylyshyn (1965– ) natural resource economics
 4 February 2009 Yuriy Izotov (1952– ) astrophysics
 4 February 2009 Herbert Kamalov (1940– ) physical chemistry
 4 February 2009 Ella Libanova (1950– ) socioeconomics
 4 February 2009 Volodymyr Makarov (1941– ) mathematics
 4 February 2009 Anatoliy Martyniuk (1941– ) mechanics
 4 February 2009 Stepan Pavliuk (1948– ) ethnology
 4 February 2009 Hryhoriy Pivtorak (1935– ) Slavic languages
 ? 2009 Mykola Perestiuk (1946– ) mathematical problems in mechanics

2010
 12 May 2010 Nikolai Bagrov (1937–2015) geography
 12 May 2010 Vadym Lialko (1931– ) geography, remote study of natural resources
 13 April 2012 Mykola Azarienkov (1951– ) disordered systems
 13 April 2012 Vil Bakirov (1946– ) sociology, socioeconomics
 13 April 2012 Oleh Bilorus (1939– ) world economics
 13 April 2012 Viktor Yehorov (1940– ) ecosystemology
 13 April 2012 Mykhailo Ilchenko (1941– ) telecommunication systems
 13 April 2012 Ivan Karnaukhov (1937– ) advanced nuclear systems and technologies
 13 April 2012 Mykola Kartel (1948– ) chemistry
 13 April 2012 Oleksandr Kovalyov (1944– ) mathematics
 13 April 2012 Anatoliy Konverskyi (1948– ) philosophy
 13 April 2012 Ihor Krivtsun (1954– ) materials science, metal welding
 13 April 2012 Oleksandr Lukin (1940– ) geology of oil and gas
 13 April 2012 Ihor Mryhlod (1960– ) liquid state physics
 13 April 2012 Dmytro Nalyvaiko (1929– ) foreign literature, comparative linguistics
 13 April 2012 Vyacheslav Petrov (1940– ) materials science, optoelectronic materials
 ? 2012 Dmytro Kiva (1942– ) aircraft manufacturing
 6 March 2015 Viacheslav Bohdanov (1965– ) mechanics
 6 March 2015 Valeriy Zadiraka (1941– ) computer technology, information security
 6 March 2015 Serhiy Kosterin (1950– ) molecular physiology, biochemistry
 6 March 2015 Anatoliy Morozov (1939– ) physics and mathematics
 6 March 2015 Oleksandr Ponomarenko (1950– ) isotope geology
 ? 2015 Yevstakhiy Kryzhanivskyi (1948– ) materials science of oil and gas industry
 7 March 2018 Yakiv Didukh (1948– ) geobotany
 7 March 2018 Stanislav Dovhyi (1954– ) geodynamics of geological environment
 7 March 2018 Ihor Yemelianov (1947– ) evolutional ecology
 7 March 2018 Tetiana Yefymenko (1950– ) economic security
 7 March 2018 Vitaliy Kalchenko (1948– ) chemistry
 7 March 2018 Oleksandr Kopylenko (1961– ) law
 7 March 2018 Roman Kushnir (1954– ) mathematical problems in mechanics
 7 March 2018 Petro Melezhyk (1950– ) theoretical physics, radiophysics
 7 March 2018 Vitaliy Pavlishchuk (1956– ) chemistry
 7 March 2018 Myroslav Pavlyuk (1943– ) geotectonics of oil and gas provinces

2020
 26 May 2021 Serhiy Akhonin (1961– ) materials science, electrometallurgy
 26 May 2021 Oleksandr Borysenko (1946– ) mathematics
 26 May 2021 Vitaliy Boyun (1941– ) computer science
 26 May 2021 Yulian Vysochanskyi (1953– ) applied physics, multiferroics
 26 May 2021 Ihor Harkusha (1963– ) plasma physics
 26 May 2021 Roman Hladyshevskyi (1958– ) crystal chemistry
 26 May 2021 Yuriy Holovach (1957– ) theoretical physics
 26 May 2021 Andriy Hrytsenko (1948– ) statistics
 26 May 2021 Svitlana Yermolenko (1937– ) Ukrainian language
 26 May 2021 Andriy Zharkin (1954– ) power engineering
 26 May 2021 Oleksandr Ishchenko (1950– ) organic chemistry
 26 May 2021 Oleksandr Kordiuk (1967– ) experimental physics of quantum materials
 26 May 2021 Mykola Kuchuk (1958– ) plant biotechnologies
 26 May 2021 Bohdan Lev (1952– ) theoretical physics
 26 May 2021 Petro Loboda (1956– ) materials science of refractory compounds
 26 May 2021 Volodymyr Nazarenko (1956– ) mechanics
 26 May 2021 Anatoliy Nosovskyi (1954– ) diagnostics and reliance of power producing complexes and objects
 26 May 2021 Vasyl Pekhnyo (1952– ) inorganic chemistry
 26 May 2021 Oleh Pylypenko (1961– ) mechanics of rocket and space systems

External links
 Alphabetical list. National Academy of Sciences of Ukraine
 Alphabetical list. National Academy of Sciences of Ukraine